Opus station is planned light rail station under construction in Minnetonka, Minnesota on the Southwest LRT extension of the Green Line. It is located north of Minnesota State Highway 62 in the Opus business development, near the intersection of Bren Road and Green Circle Drive. The station's construction spurred residential development in the area prior to opening.

References

External links
Opus Station Engineering Design

Metro Green Line (Minnesota) stations
Railway stations scheduled to open in 2025
Railway stations under construction in the United States